Laura Lee Ochoa (born October 14, 1986), also known as Leezy, is an American musician and singer-songwriter, best known as the bass guitarist and one of the founding members of the musical trio Khruangbin.

Biography
The daughter of Mexican-American parents, Ochoa played piano and guitar as a child, but picked up bass at the suggestion of (then future) bandmate Mark Speer. Ochoa met him in 2009 through friends, where they initially connected over a shared love of Afghan music. Ochoa was an art history major with a focus on art of the ancient Near East. She worked as a math teacher for six years. At the time, she was interested in playing piano again and he suggested she "follow the sound of the bass", which she had never thought about doing before. This recommendation led to her to begin playing, which she says came very naturally to her.

Ochoa has recorded three studio albums with Khruangbin: The Universe Smiles Upon You (2015), Con Todo el Mundo (2018), Mordechai (2020) and two EPs: Texas Sun (2021) and Texas Moon (2022), both with the band and Leon Bridges. Prior to forming the group, Lee played bass on tour with Yppah. In April, 2021, she collaborated with Los Angeles-based singer-songwriter Niia on the song "Not Up For Discussion."

Style and stage persona
In Khruangbin, Ochoa performs as "Leezy", an alter-ego that helps her keep some parts of herself private: "It helps me separate from her and it helps me emotionally to put it on her, so I let her take on all of the pressure." She is the band's creative director, using her training in art and architecture to set up staging and create choreography and graphic design. Both she and Speer sport long black wigs while performing and "Leezy" goes through many costume changes throughout a show. In 2011, she made the decision to never wear the same outfit twice on stage, estimating that she has worn 600 different outfits whilst on tour. She wears two different outfits per show, a decision inspired by Elton John, who was known to change up to four outfits. She is also inspired by Prince who handled choreography and played guitar at the same time.

References

21st-century American bass guitarists
Living people
1986 births
Musicians from Houston
American musicians of Mexican descent
Women bass guitarists